List of Lithuanian diplomats includes Lithuanian diplomats that continued to represent independent Lithuania after it was occupied by the Soviet Union in June 1940.

United States did not recognize the Soviet annexation as legitimate according to the long-standing Stimson Doctrine. The Welles Declaration of July 23, 1940, applied the doctrine to the Baltic situation. Many western countries followed the American example and did not recognize the occupation. This formed the basis for the state continuity of the Baltic states and enabled Lithuanian diplomats stationed in various embassies and consulates continue their work on behalf of the independent Lithuania until the collapse of the Soviet Union in August 1991.

Locations before the occupation
According to the Ministry of Foreign Affairs, as of 1 January 1939, Lithuania had 14 legations (London, Paris, Berlin, Washington, D.C., Moscow, Rome, Holy See, Brussels, Buenos Aires, Riga, Tallinn, Geneva (to the League of Nations), Prague, and Warsaw), eight general consulates (New York, Copenhagen, Toronto, Königsberg, Zürich, Rotterdam, Tel Aviv, Klaipėda), six consulates (Chicago, São Paulo, Riga, Daugavpils, Liepāja, Tilsit), seven honorary general consulates, 33 honorary consulates, and six honorary vice-consulates.

In fall 1940, the Lithuanian diplomatic service had five legations (Washington, D.C., London, the Holy See, Geneva and Buenos Aires), two general consulates (New York and Tel Aviv), and three consulates (Chicago, São Paulo, and Harbin). By the time Lithuania declared independence in March 1990, it was left with three legations and two consulates.

List

See also
 List of Lithuanian diplomats (1918–1940)

References

Bibliography

Lithuanian Soviet Socialist Republic
Baltic diplomatic missions
Occupation of the Baltic states
Lithuania diplomacy-related lists